Epicopeia caroli is a moth in the family Epicopeiidae. It was described by Janet in 1909. It is found in China.

Subspecies
Epicopeia caroli caroli
Epicopeia caroli fukienensis Chu & Wang 1981
Epicopeia caroli tienmuensis Chu & Wang, 1981

References

Moths described in 1909
Epicopeiidae